Artūrs Kuzmenkovs (born December 1, 1993) is a Latvian ice hockey  forward who plays for Kraft in the 2. Divisioona.

Playing career
He started his professional career with Liepājas Metalurgs. On June 9, 2013, Kuzmenkovs signed a two-year contract with Dinamo Rīga.
On September 5 of 2013/14 season he played his first game in KHL in win against Dinamo Minsk.

International
Kuzmenkovs played in several world junior championships with the Latvian national team.

References

External links

 

1993 births
Living people
Sportspeople from Daugavpils
Latvian ice hockey forwards
HK Riga players
Dinamo Riga players
HK Liepājas Metalurgs players